The Reggiane Re.2006 was an Italian fighter aircraft, of which only one prototype was built.

Development 
In 1943, Reggiane started work on a version of the Re.2005 that was powered by a Daimler-Benz DB 603.  After the bombing of the Reggiane plants in Reggio Emilia, the development team was able to move to Correggio along with some of the finished parts, which were hidden in a high school.  They completed the construction of the prototype (without the engine), however, it was not handed over to the Luftwaffe.  The project was kept secret and no information was disclosed to the public.

Aircraft on display 
In 1946, the Royal Air Force studied the Re.2006, but it was of little of value and was destroyed, having never flown. However, a part of the landing gear survived and is displayed at Museo Nazionale Scienza e Tecnologia Leonardo da Vinci.

See also

References

Bibliography

Reggiane aircraft
World War II Italian fighter aircraft
1940s Italian fighter aircraft
Low-wing aircraft
Single-engined tractor aircraft